Nikola Šarounová, née Mazurová (born 22 November 1994) is a Czech sports shooter. She competed in the women's 10 metre air rifle event at the 2016 Summer Olympics.

References

External links
 

1994 births
Living people
Czech female sport shooters
Olympic shooters of the Czech Republic
Shooters at the 2016 Summer Olympics
Shooters at the 2020 Summer Olympics
People from Rychnov nad Kněžnou
Shooters at the 2015 European Games
Shooters at the 2019 European Games
European Games medalists in shooting
European Games bronze medalists for the Czech Republic
European Games silver medalists for the Czech Republic
Sportspeople from the Hradec Králové Region
21st-century Czech women